Pikul Khueanpet (born 20 September 1988) is a Thai international footballer who plays as a midfielder.

International goals

References

External links 
 
 

1988 births
Living people
Women's association football midfielders
Pikul Khueanpet
Footballers at the 2010 Asian Games
Footballers at the 2014 Asian Games
Pikul Khueanpet
Pikul Khueanpet
Pikul Khueanpet
Pikul Khueanpet
Southeast Asian Games medalists in football
Footballers at the 2018 Asian Games
Competitors at the 2007 Southeast Asian Games
Competitors at the 2017 Southeast Asian Games
2019 FIFA Women's World Cup players
FIFA Century Club
Pikul Khueanpet
Competitors at the 2019 Southeast Asian Games
2015 FIFA Women's World Cup players